Erigeron robustior is a North American species of flowering plant in the family Asteraceae known by the common name white cushion fleabane or Willamette fleabane. It is native to the southwestern Oregon and northern California in the western United States.

Erigeron robustior grows in rocky of gravely slopes, sometimes in serpentine soil. It is an perennial herb up to 55 centimeters (22 inches) tall, forming a thin tap root, not growing into colonies as do some of the other species in the genus. The inflorescence usually contains 1-3 flower heads. Each head contains 21–36 white or pink ray florets surrounding many yellow disc florets.

References

robustior
Flora of Oregon
Flora of California
Plants described in 1947
Flora without expected TNC conservation status
Taxa named by Arthur Cronquist